The 1980 Big Sky Conference men's basketball tournament was the fifth edition of the tournament, held February 29 and March 1 at the Dee Events Center at Weber State College in Ogden, Utah.

Top-seeded Weber State defeated  in the championship game, 50–42, to clinch their third consecutive Big Sky tournament title. The Wildcats had played in all five finals, dropping the first two.

Format
Introduced in 1976, the Big Sky tournament had the same format for its first eight editions. The regular season champion hosted and only the top four teams from the standings took part, with seeding based on regular season conference records.

Second-seeded Idaho made its inaugural appearance in the conference tournament, having been in last place in the previous five seasons. Membership in the Big Sky remained at eight: Gonzaga left in the summer of 1979 for the WCAC and was replaced by Nevada–Reno.

Bracket

NCAA tournament
Weber State received the automatic bid to the expanded 48-team NCAA tournament, and were seeded seventh in the West region. In the first round at their home venue in Ogden, the Wildcats lost by a point to Lamar.

References

Big Sky Conference men's basketball tournament
Tournament
Big Sky Conference men's basketball tournament
Big Sky Conference men's basketball tournament
Big Sky Conference men's basketball tournament
Basketball competitions in Ogden, Utah
College sports tournaments in Utah